"Tokyo" is the twentieth single by Japanese artist Masaharu Fukuyama. It was released on 17 August 2005.

Track listing

Limited Edition CD
Tokyo
Watashiha Kaze Ninaru
Tokyo (Original Karaoke)
Watashiha Kaze Ninaru (Original Karaoke)

Limited Edition DVD
Tokyo (Image clip)

Normal Edition CD
Tokyo
Watashiha Kaze Ninaru
Tokyo (Original Karaoke)
Watashiha Kaze Ninaru (Original Karaoke)

Oricon sales chart (Japan)

References

2005 singles
Masaharu Fukuyama songs
Japanese television drama theme songs
2005 songs
Universal Music Japan singles